Conditioned is the third full-length studio album from hardcore punk  band, Straight Faced. It was released in July, 1998 on Epitaph Records and follows Broken released in 1996. The album was produced by Ryan Greene, and the track "Let's Do This" appeared on Epitaph Records' Punk-O-Rama Vol. 4 compilation. An alternative version of the track "Regret" appeared on Fearless Records' Flush Sampler and "Against" was featured in the Electronic Arts' PlayStation game, Street Sk8er.

Track listing

Personnel
Straight Faced
 Johnny Miller – vocals
 David Tonic – guitar
 Damon Beard – guitar
 Kevin Norton – bass
 Ron Moeller – drums
Production
 Recorded at Motor Studios, San Francisco, California, USA
 Produced by Ryan Greene
 Mastered by Ramon Breton

References

External links
Epitaph Records album page

Epitaph Records albums
1998 albums
Straight Faced albums
Albums produced by Ryan Greene